The  was a Japan Ground Self-Defense Force (JGSDF) tracked armored mortar carrier that based on JGSDF Type 60 Armoured Personnel Carrier Type SU-II. The official abbreviation for the vehicle is 107MSP and also known as SX in JGSDF. The Type 60 has been replaced by newer Type 96 since mid-to-late 1990s.

See also 
 Type 60 81 mm self-propelled mortar
 Type 96 120 mm self-propelled mortar

References

External links

Japan Ground Self-Defense Force
Tracked mortars
Armoured fighting vehicles of Japan
Artillery of Japan
Military vehicles introduced in the 1960s